WRTD-CD, virtual channel 54 (UHF digital channel 15), is a Class A Telemundo owned-and-operated television station licensed to Raleigh, North Carolina, United States. The station is owned by the Telemundo Station Group subsidiary of NBCUniversal. Under a channel sharing agreement, WRTD-CD shares transmitter facilities with Fox affiliate WRAZ (channel 50, owned by locally based Capitol Broadcasting Company) near Auburn, North Carolina. The station originates its master control from the facilities of WZDC-CD in Washington, D.C., whose website links to WRTD's public file.

Despite WRTD-CD legally holding a low-power Class A license, it transmits using WRAZ's full-power spectrum. This ensures complete reception across the Research Triangle television market (Raleigh−Durham−Chapel Hill−Fayetteville).

History

The station signed on in 1991 as W60BT. Its call sign was changed to WHOA-LP in 1999, and to WZGS-CA in 2005.

WZGS-CA went silent on April 1, 2010, due to losing its first affiliation with the Spanish-language Telemundo network. It then became an independent station, airing English, Spanish and Portuguese programming. In the interim, the national cable/satellite feed for Telemundo served the market.

WZGS-CA resumed broadcasting on March 25, 2011. The station changed its call sign to WZGS-CD on May 31, 2013.

On December 4, 2017, NBCUniversal's Telemundo Station Group announced its purchase of ZGS Communications' 13 television stations, including WZGS-CD. The sale marks NBCUniversal's re-entry into the Raleigh–Durham market, as they owned WNCN (channel 17) from 1996 to 2006 (it is now a CBS affiliate, owned by Nexstar Media Group). The sale was completed on July 20, 2018. NBCUniversal changed the station's call letters to WRTD-CD on July 25, 2018; the station also rejoined Telemundo.

Subchannel

References

External links

Telemundo Station Group
RTD-CD
Television channels and stations established in 1991
1991 establishments in North Carolina
Low-power television stations in the United States
RTD-CD